In Your Arms may refer to:

Music
Albums
In Your Arms (album), 1995 album by Emjay

Songs
"In Your Arms", a song by  Chieli Minucci &  Fernando Saunders from Chieli's 1996 album Renaissance
"In Your Arms" (Destine song), a 2009 song by Destine
"In Your Arms" (Diana Ross song), a song by Diana Ross from her 1982 album Silk Electric
"In Your Arms" (Nico & Vinz song), a 2013 song by Norwegian hip hop duo Envy, later on recredited as a Nico & Vinz song with change of name in January 2014 to Nico & Vinz 
"In Your Arms (Love song from Neighbours)" a 1989 song by Lynne Hamilton
"In Your Arms", a 1996 song by Emjay
"In Your Arms", a 2011 song by Irish/British girlband Wonderland from their self-titled debut album Wonderland
"In Your Arms", a 2013 song by the Backstreet Boys, included on some editions of their In a World Like This album
 "In Your Arms", a 2010 song by Kina Grannis, from the album Stairwells.

See also
"Here (In Your Arms)", a 2006 song by Hellogoodbye from their Zombies! Aliens! Vampires! Dinosaurs!
"In Your Arms Tonight", a song by TLC from their 2002 album 3D